The Ruggles River is a waterway in Qikiqtaaluk Region, Nunavut, Canada. It is located within Ellesmere Island's Quttinirpaaq National Park. The Ruggles River flows southeast to Chandler Fiord and out to Lady Franklin Bay.

It is the most high-latitude of the known rivers, whose watercourse persists throughout the year without drying out or freezing of the channel in winter. The inflow of water in winter is provided by Lake Hazen, in the middle part of which its source is located. But during exceptionally cold years, the Ruggles River can freeze to the bottom in winter due to the low level of the lake.

The river drops  in elevation between its source and its mouth. It is populated by Arctic char.

History
In 1958, a 13th-century winter house was excavated along the Ruggles River.

See also
List of rivers of Nunavut

References

Ellesmere Island
Rivers of Qikiqtaaluk Region